Troublesome Creek Ironworks, originally called Speedwell Furnace, is a historic iron furnace and archaeological site located near Monroeton, Rockingham County, North Carolina. The ironworks were established by 1770, and remained in operation into the early 20th century.   After the Battle of Guilford Courthouse on March 15, 1781, General Nathanael Greene's troops camped at the ironworks to plan for a second attack by Cornwallis.  George Washington visited the ironworks during his southern tour of 1791.

It was listed on the National Register of Historic Places in 1972.

References

Archaeological sites on the National Register of Historic Places in North Carolina
Commercial buildings completed in 1770
Buildings and structures in Rockingham County, North Carolina
National Register of Historic Places in Rockingham County, North Carolina
1770 establishments in North Carolina